Meji Mwamba is a Democratic Republic of the Congo boxer. At the 2012 Summer Olympics, he competed in the Men's super heavyweight, but was defeated in the first round by Magomedrasul Majidov of Azerbaijan.

References

Democratic Republic of the Congo male boxers
Year of birth missing (living people)
Living people
Olympic boxers of the Democratic Republic of the Congo
Boxers at the 2012 Summer Olympics
Super-heavyweight boxers